Neacerea is a genus of moths in the subfamily Arctiinae.

Species
Neacerea atava (Druce, 1884)
Neacerea albiventus Druce, 1898
Neacerea brunnea Druce, 1898
Neacerea dizona Druce, 1898
Neacerea maculosa Hampson, 1898
Neacerea minutum (Möschler, 1878)
Neacerea pusilla (Butler, 1878)
Neacerea rubricincta Hampson, 1898
Neacerea rufiventris (Schaus, 1894)
Neacerea testacea (Druce, 1884)

References
Natural History Museum Lepidoptera generic names catalog

Arctiinae
Moth genera